Bhilawadi railway station is a railway station serving Bhilawadi town in Sangli district of Maharashtra State of India. It is under Pune railway division of Central Railway Zone of Indian Railways. Its code is BVQ. The station consists of a single platform. The station is near a large plant of Hindustan Petroleum and India's largest private diary of Chitale group.

Trains 
 Koyna Express
 Maharashtra Express
 Sahyadri Express
 CSMT Kolhapur–Satara Passenger
 CSMT Kolhapur–Pune Passenger

References

Pune railway division
Railway stations in Sangli district